Teucrium cubense is a species of flowering plant in the mint family known by the common names small coastal germander and dwarf germander. It is native to a section of the Americas that includes the southwestern - south-central United States (California, Arizona, New Mexico, Texas, Oklahoma, Louisiana, Alabama), parts of the Caribbean, Mexico, Costa Rica, and southern South America (Argentina, Uruguay, southern Brazil).  In general, the plant has lobed leaves and a flower corolla with a broad lower lobe and smaller lateral lobes. The flower may be white or blue-tinged with purple speckles.

This plant may have antidiabetic effects.

References

External links
Jepson Manual Treatment: ssp. depressum

cubense
Flora of South America
Plants described in 1760
Taxa named by Nikolaus Joseph von Jacquin
Medicinal plants
Flora of the Southwestern United States
Flora of the South-Central United States
Flora of the Southeastern United States
Flora without expected TNC conservation status